Ninja-Myanmar relation refers to the international relations between ninjas, Japanese covert agents and Myanmar, previously called Burma. Despite the fact that there is no evidence of traditional ninjas' existence in Burma, they have been depicted in popular culture due to the close relationship between Japanese secret agency and Burmese revolutionaries during World War II.

History 
The first Japanese people to come to Burma is thought to be Rōnin warriors who served local kingdoms. For example, some kirishitan samurai belonging to Society of Jesus fled from the ban of Catholicism by Tokugawa Ieyasu. They settled in Ayutthaya Kingdom then moved to and served Kingdom of Mrauk U in 1612. According to the tradition of Shan people, many samurai fled from Ayutthaya Kingdom served local kings of Kengtung. However, there is no record of Japanese ninja in Burmese kingdoms during this period.

In 1941, thirty Burmese independent activists supported by Japanese empire received military training by special intelligence unit called . Minami Kikan was mainly composed of the graduates of Nakano School where Fujita Seiko, "The last ninja” taught Kōga-ryū ninjutsu in the early days of the school. Among the Burmese, four men (Ne Win, Yan Naing, Zeya, and Kyaw Zaw) were chosen to specialize in field command, sabotage and guerrilla warfare. 
It was among a few rare cases that foreign soldiers were trained by Nakano graduates along with Russians trained by Japanese secret military agency in Harbin.

In October 26, 2019, Jinichi Kawakami, the head of Banke Shinobinoden who claims himself as  only heir to authentic ninjutsu arrived at Yangon and demonstrated his art.

In popular culture 
 Burmese neckless (『ビルマの首飾り』)-Children's literature written by Kazuo Musha, a veteran of the Battle of Imphal. The main protagonist, Fukushima was a Japanese soldier and descendant of Koga ninja utilized his skill in the battle.
 Ninja: Shadow of a Tear-In the prologue, ninja took part in Burma campaign. In the main part, Goto the enemy ninja ran a drug cartel in Myanmar.
 Sekai Ninja Sen Jiraiya-One of the World Ninjas, Parchis was born in Burma.

See also 

 Foreign ninja
 Ninja presence in Russia
 List of foreign-born samurai in Japan

References 

M
Japan–Myanmar relations